Angela Maxine O'Brien (born January 15, 1937) is an American film, radio, television, and stage actress, and is one of the last surviving stars from the Golden Age of Hollywood cinema. Beginning a prolific career as a child actress in feature films for Metro-Goldwyn-Mayer  at age four, O'Brien became one of the most popular child stars in cinema history and was honored with a Juvenile Academy Award as the outstanding child actress of 1944.  In her later career, she appeared on television, on stage, and in supporting film roles.

Life and career
Margaret O'Brien was born Maxine O'Brien. She used that name in 1941, when she appeared in a WWII civil defense film and made a minor appearance in her first feature film, after which she became a contract player with Metro-Goldwyn-Mayer, which changed her first name and cast her in the title role of the film Journey for Margaret. O'Brien's mother, Gladys Flores, was a flamenco dancer who often performed with her sister Marissa, who was also a dancer. O'Brien is of half-Irish and half-Spanish ancestry. She was raised Catholic.

Film

O'Brien made her first film appearance in Metro-Goldwyn-Mayer's Babes on Broadway (1941) at the age of four, but it was the following year that her first major role brought her widespread attention. As a five-year-old in Journey for Margaret (1942), O'Brien won wide praise for her quite convincing acting style, unusual for a child of her age. By 1943, she was considered a big enough star to have a cameo appearance in the all-star military show finale of Thousands Cheer. Also In 1943, at the age of seven, Margaret co-starred in "You, John Jones," a "War Bond/Effort," short film, with James Cagney and Ann Sothern (playing their daughter), in which she dramatically recited President Lincoln's "Gettysburg Address." She played Adèle, a young French girl, and spoke and sang all her dialogue with a French accent in Jane Eyre (1943).

Arguably her most memorable role was in Meet Me in St. Louis (1944), opposite Judy Garland.   As Tootie Smith, the feisty but fragile little sister of Judy Garland, she was a bright point, especially in her musical numbers with Garland and during a Halloween sequence in which she confronts a grouchy neighbor. For her performance, she was awarded a special juvenile Oscar in 1944. 

Margaret and June Allyson were known as "The Town Criers" of MGM.  "We were always in competition: I wanted to cry better than June, and June wanted to cry better than me. The way my mother got me to cry was if I was having trouble with a scene, she'd say, 'why don't we have the make-up man come over and give you false tears?' Then I'd think to myself, 'they'll say I'm not as good as June,' and I'd start to cry." 

Her other successes included The Canterville Ghost (1944), Our Vines Have Tender Grapes (1945), Bad Bascomb (1946) with Wallace Beery, and the first sound version of The Secret Garden (1949). She played Beth in the 1949 MGM release of Little Women, but she was unable to make the transition to adult roles.

O'Brien later shed her child star image, appearing on a 1958 cover of Life magazine with the caption "How the Girl's Grown", and was a mystery guest on the TV panel show What's My Line?. O'Brien's acting appearances as an adult have been sporadic, mostly in small independent films and occasional television roles. She has also given interviews, mostly for the Turner Classic Movies cable network.

Television
O'Brien gave credit to television for helping her reform and modify her public image. In an interview in 1957, when she was 20, she said: "The wonderful thing about TV is that it has given me a chance to get out of the awkward age — something the movies couldn't do for me. No movie producer could really afford to take a chance at handing me an adult role."

On November 20, 1950, she co-starred with Cecil Parker in "The Canterville Ghost", on Robert Montgomery Presents on TV. She appeared as the mystery guest on "What's My Line" November 24, 1957. On December 22, 1957, O'Brien starred in "The Young Years" on General Electric Theater. She played the role of Betsy Stauffer, a small-town nurse, in "The Incident of the Town in Terror" on television's Rawhide. She appeared in an episode of Wagon Train in 1958.  She made a guest appearance on a 1963 episode of Perry Mason as Virginia Trent in "The Case of the Shoplifter's Shoe."  In 1967, she made a guest appearance on the World War II TV drama Combat!. Also, in a 1968 two-part episode of Ironside ("Split Second to an Epitaph") O'Brien played a pharmacist who (quite the opposite of her usual screen persona) was involved in drug theft and was accessory to attempted murder of star Raymond Burr's Ironside. Another rare television outing was as a guest star on the popular Marcus Welby, M.D. in the early 1970s, reuniting O'Brien with her Journey for Margaret and The Canterville Ghost co-star Robert Young.

In 1991, O'Brien appeared in Murder, She Wrote, season 7, episode "Who Killed J.B. Fletcher?", reuniting O'Brien with her Tenth Avenue Angel co-star Angela Lansbury.

Academy Award

While O'Brien was growing up, her awards were always kept in a special room. One day in 1954, the family's maid asked to take O'Brien's Juvenile Oscar and two other awards home with her to polish, as she had done in the past. After three days, the maid failed to return to work, prompting O'Brien's mother to discharge her, requesting that the awards be returned. Not long after, O'Brien's mother, who had been sick with a heart condition, suffered a relapse and died. In mourning, 17-year-old O'Brien forgot about the maid and the Oscar until several months later when she tried to contact her, only to find that the maid had moved and had left no forwarding address.

Several years later, upon learning that the original had been stolen, the Academy promptly supplied O'Brien with a replacement Oscar, but O'Brien still held on to hope that she might one day recover her original Award. In the years that followed, O'Brien attended memorabilia shows and searched antique shops, hoping she might find the original statuette, until one day in 1995 when Bruce Davis, then executive director of the Academy, was alerted that a miniature statuette bearing O'Brien's name had surfaced in a catalogue for an upcoming memorabilia auction. Davis contacted a mutual friend of his and O'Brien's, who in turn phoned O'Brien to tell her the long-lost Oscar had been found.

Memorabilia collectors Steve Neimand and Mark Nash were attending a flea market in 1995 when Neimand spotted a small Oscar with Margaret O'Brien's name inscribed upon it. The two men decided to split the $500 asking price hoping to resell it at a profit and lent it to a photographer to shoot for an upcoming auction catalogue. This led to Bruce Davis' discovery that the statuette had resurfaced and, upon learning of the award's history, Nash and Neimand agreed to return the Oscar to O'Brien. On February 7, 1995, nearly 50 years after she had first received it, and nearly 40 years since it had been stolen, the Academy held a special ceremony in Beverly Hills to return the stolen award to O'Brien. Upon being reunited with her Juvenile Oscar, Margaret O'Brien spoke to the attending journalists:
For all those people who have lost or misplaced something that was dear to them, as I have, never give up the dream of searching—never let go of the hope that you'll find it because after all these many years, at last, my Oscar has been returned to me.

Additional honors
In February 1960, O'Brien was honored with two stars on the Hollywood Walk of Fame, one for motion pictures at 6606 Hollywood Boulevard, and one for television at 1634 Vine St. In 1990, O'Brien was honored by the Young Artist Foundation with its Former Child Star "Lifetime Achievement" Award recognizing her outstanding achievements within the film industry as a child actress.  In 2006, she was presented with a Lifetime Achievement Award by the SunDeis Film Festival at Brandeis University.

Personal life
O'Brien has been married twice, to Harold Allen, Jr. from August 9, 1959, to 1968, and in 1974 to steel-industry executive Roy Thorvald Thorsen. The later marriage produced her only child, Mara Tolene Thorsen, born in 1977.

Filmography

Select radio credits

Accolades

Box office ranking
For a time O'Brien was voted by exhibitors as among the most popular stars in the country.

 1945: 9th
 1946: 8th
 1947: 19th

References

Bibliography
 Best, Marc. Those Endearing Young Charms: Child Performers of the Screen (South Brunswick and New York: Barnes & Co., 1971), p. 203–208.
 Dye, David. Child and Youth Actors: Filmography of Their Entire Careers, 1914–1985. Jefferson, NC: McFarland & Co., 1988, pp. 170–171.

External links

 

 "Interview with Margaret O'Brien" – Brattleboro Reformer (Vermont), December 12, 2018.

1937 births
Living people
20th-century American actresses
21st-century American actresses
Academy Juvenile Award winners
Actresses from San Diego
American child actresses
American film actresses
American radio actresses
American television actresses
American stage actresses
Hispanic and Latino American actresses
Vaudeville performers
American people of Irish descent
American people of Spanish descent
Metro-Goldwyn-Mayer contract players